"King of the Hill" is the twenty-third episode of the ninth season of the American animated television series The Simpsons. It originally aired on the Fox network in the United States on May 3, 1998. It was written by John Swartzwelder and directed by Steven Dean Moore, and guest stars Brendan Fraser and Steven Weber. The episode sees Homer trying to climb a large mountain to impress Bart after he humiliates him at a church picnic with his lack of fitness.

Plot
After his obesity embarrasses Bart at a church picnic, Homer attempts to lose weight by going on midnight jogs around town. He soon discovers "Power Sauce", an energy bar made with apples which he starts to eat regularly. 

At a gym, Homer meets Rainier Wolfcastle, who becomes his fitness coach. In two months, Homer is healthier, and more muscular and reveals his new exercise habits to his family. At the gym, two Power Sauce representatives, Brad and Neil, ask Rainier to climb to the top of Springfield's tallest mountain, "The Murderhorn", as a publicity stunt. When he refuses, Bart insists Homer volunteer to do it.

Grampa begs Homer not to climb the mountain, telling him how he "died" when he was betrayed by a friend, C. W. McAllister, during their climb on the Murderhorn in 1928, also as a corporate publicity stunt, but he accepts the challenge and is aided by two Sherpas, whom he fires after waking up one night to find them secretly dragging him up. Homer radios this to Brad and Neil, who fail to convince him to abandon the climb.

The mountain proves too treacherous and high for Homer, who takes shelter in a cave. In it, he finds McAllister's frozen body and evidence proving it was Grampa who betrayed him. Too tired and ashamed to continue, Homer sticks his flagpole on the plateau. An ensuing crack collapses the rest of the mountain, making the plateau he is on the peak. Proud, Homer uses McAllister's body to sled down the mountainside, where he is greeted by the crowd.

Production
The episode was pitched and written by John Swartzwelder. The writing staff had to find a new angle for Homer's weight problems, as the idea had been used several times before. This was emphasized in this episode when Marge does not seem to care that Homer is going to try to lose weight again.

In the scenes where the Sherpas were speaking, the show staff went to great lengths to find translations. Originally, the producers of the film adaption of the book Into Thin Air were contacted to help. The film producers were shocked at the trouble the Simpsons staff were going to, and replied that they had simply made up translations in the film. The staff then had to consult various experts by telephone.

The idea of the upper part of the mountain collapsing so Homer would be at the peak came from Mike Scully's brother Brian, after the staff "desperately needed a way out".

Cultural references
The mountain Homer must climb, the Murderhorn, is a reference to the mountain Matterhorn, which is located in the Swiss Alps. The name of the episode is a reference to the Fox series King of the Hill.

When the Power Sauce representatives confess to Homer that their nutrition bars are made from apple cores and Chinese newspapers, Homer looks at the bar he is eating and reads a headline that Deng Xiaoping died. The Chinese leader did, indeed, die in February 1997, a little over a year before this episode aired.

Reception
In its original broadcast, "King of the Hill" finished 23rd in ratings for the week of April 27–May 4, 1998, with a Nielsen rating of 9.4, equivalent to approximately 9.2 million viewing households. It was the fourth highest-rated show on the Fox network that week, following The X-Files, King of the Hill, and Ally McBeal.

The authors of the book I Can't Believe It's a Bigger and Better Updated Unofficial Simpsons Guide, Warren Martyn and Adrian Wood, thought well of the episode, stating: "A quite charming little adventure in which, in an effort to impress Bart, Homer undertakes a dangerous adventure and comes through successfully. It's nice because just for once, to all intents and purposes, Homer actually succeeds in something."

References

External links

 
 

The Simpsons (season 9) episodes
1998 American television episodes
Television shows written by John Swartzwelder
Television episodes about publicity stunts
Physical fitness in popular culture